John Bagwell (1751 – 21 December 1816), was a Member of Parliament (MP) for the pre-Union constituency of Tipperary and Colonel of the Tipperary Militia which he raised in 1793.

After the Act of Union, he sat in the House of Commons of the United Kingdom for 1801 to 1806 as MP for Tipperary.

Family
He was the son of William Bagwell and Jane Harper. Bagwell built Marlfield House, Clonmel as the family residence. In 1774 he married Mary Hare, with whom he had six children, including William and Richard.

Politics
He ran unsuccessfully for Cork City in 1775 and in 1792 was declared a member for Tipperary in the Parliament of Ireland by a committee of the House of Commons, sitting until the Union with Great Britain in 1801. 
During the Act of Union debates he controversially changed his vote twice, 'to the disgust of the [then] Lord Lieutenant', Charles Cornwallis. Bagwell went on to support the government of William Pitt the Younger, but expected certain appointment for his sons in return, namely 'a deanery for Richard, full-pay employment in the army for John and succession to his colonelcy of the county militia for William.'

After the Union he was elected MP for Tipperary in the UK Parliament. Bagwell never gained a peerage, the Chief Secretary stating that he believed it was 'because of a nickname'.

References

Politicians from County Tipperary
John
1751 births
1816 deaths
Irish MPs 1790–1797
Irish MPs 1798–1800
Members of the Parliament of the United Kingdom for County Tipperary constituencies (1801–1922)
UK MPs 1801–1802
UK MPs 1802–1806
Members of the Parliament of Ireland (pre-1801) for County Tipperary constituencies